Kem Sitsongpeenong (Thai: เข้ม ศิษย์สองพี่น้อง; born December 16, 1984), formerly known as Khem Fairtex, is a Thai Muay Thai kickboxer and the reigning Thailand and WMC Muaythai super welterweight world champion.

Biography and career
Kem Sitsongpeenong was born as Surasak Pakkhothakang (สุรศักดิ์ ปักโคทะกัง) in Maha Sarakham Province in Northeastern (Isan) region of Thailand on December 16, 1984. He had his first fight at the age of 13 in 1997.

Following a disappointing showing at the IFMA 2012 World Muaythai Championships where he lost out to Vitaly Gurkov in the finals to take bronze, Kem returned to the professional ranks on September 28, 2012 when he defeated Thepsuthin Pumpanmuang, Prakaysaeng Gaiyang 5 Daow and Sirimongkol Sitanuparp, respectively, to win the Toyota Vigo Marathon 2012.

Kem lost to eventual tournament winner Andy Souwer by majority decision (29-29, 29-28, 30-28) at the quarter-final stage of the Shoot Boxing World Tournament 2012 on November 17, 2012 in Tokyo, Japan.

He was knocked out with a third round elbow by former stablemate Yodsaenklai Fairtex at Muay Thai Combat Mania: Pattaya in Pattaya, Thailand on December 30, 2012.

Kem fought to a draw with Jordan Watson in a three round bout at Yokkao Extreme 2013 on January 26, 2013 in Milan, Italy.

He floored Mickael Piscitello with elbows numerous times en route to a unanimous decision win at Best of Siam 3 in Paris, France, on February 14, 2013.

On May 6, 2013, Kem defeated Dylan Salvador by unanimous decision at MAX Muay Thai 1 in Surin, Thailand.

It was reported that he would fight Mehdi Zatout at the WBC World Muay Thai Millennium Championship in Saint-Pierre, Réunion on September 7, 2013. However, he denied ever being on the card.

He was expected to fight at MAX Muay Thai 2 in Jakarta, Indonesia on June 29, 2013 but withdrew for undisclosed reasons.

He KO'd Maiki Karathanasis with a third round elbow at MAX Muay Thai 3 in Zhengzhou, China on August 10, 2013.

He beat Vahid Roshani by decision at MAX Muay Thai 5: The Final Chapter in Khon Kaen, Thailand on December 10, 2013.

Kem lost the WBC Muaythai World Super Welterweight (-69.8 kg/154 lb) Championship when he was defeated by Vitaly Gurkov via decision at Ring Wars in Milan, Italy, on January 25, 2014.

Kem competed in the welterweight (-70 kg/154 lb) tournament at Xtreme Muay Thai 2014 in Kowloon, Hong Kong on March 29, 2014, and was initially set to face Seyedisa Alamdarnezam in the semi-finals. His opponent was later changed to Victor Nagbe, who knocked out Kem with a second round high kick.

He defeated Singmanee Kaewsamrit via TKO due to a cut in round two at Muay Thai in Macau on June 6, 2014.

Titles and achievements

Professional:
 2012 Toyota Vigo Marathon Tournament Champion (154 lbs)
 2012 WBC World Muaythai Super Welterweight Champion (154 lbs/69.853 kg)
 2011 Thai Fight Tournament Champion (-67 kg)
 2011 21st Isuzu Cup Tournament Winner
 2010 Nuit des Champions Muaythai belt (-70 kg)
 2010 Explosion Fight Night Volume 01 Tournament champion (71 kg)
 2009 MTA Muaythai World champion (69 kg)
 2009 Nuit des Champions Muaythai belt (-67 kg)
 2009 WMC Super Welterweight (154 lbs) World champion
 2009 Thailand Super Welterweight (154 lbs) champion
 2008 WMC/S-1 King's Cup tournament champion
 2006 Rajadamnern Stadium Super Featherweight (130 lbs) champion
 Thailand Super Bantamweight champion
Amateur:
2012 I.F.M.A. World Championships in Saint Petersburg, Russia  -71 kg

Fight record

|-  bgcolor="#FFBBBB"
| 2017-01-13 || Loss ||align=left| Qiu Jianliang || Glory of Heroes 6 || Jiyuan, China || KO (Spinning Back Kick to the Body) || 1 || 2:19 
|-
|-  bgcolor="#CCFFCC"
| 2016-10-01|| Win ||align=left| Ji Xiang || Glory of Heroes 5 || Zhengzhou, China || Decision (Unanimous)|| 3 || 3:00
|-  bgcolor="#CCFFCC"
| 2016-07-05|| Win ||align=left| Hu yafei || Glory of Heroes 3 || Jiyuan, China || Decision|| 3 || 3:00
|-  bgcolor="#CCFFCC"
| 2016-06-05|| Win ||align=left|  Umar Semata  || Emei Legend 9 || China  || Decision|| 3 || 3:00
|-
|-  bgcolor="#CCFFCC"
| 2016-10-01|| Win ||align=left| Tie Yinghua || Glory of Heroes 2 || Shenzhen, China  || Decision|| 3 || 3:00
|-
|-  bgcolor="#FFBBBB"
| 2015-12-28 || Loss ||align=left| Dmitry Varats || Topking World Series 8, Semi Finals|| Pattaya, Thailand || TKO || 1 ||
|-  bgcolor="#CCFFCC"
| 2015-10-17|| Win ||align=left|  Sergey Kulyaba ||Top King World Series 7 Final 8|| China  || Decision|| 3 || 3:00
|-
|-  bgcolor="#CCFFCC"
| 2015-06-26|| Win ||align=left| Martin Meoni ||Top King World Series Final 16 || China  || TKO(referee stoppage)|| 2 || 3:00
|-
|-  bgcolor="#CCFFCC"
| 2015-06-26|| Win ||align=left| Wang Pengfei || silu hero || China  || KO(right knee to the body) || 2 || 
|-
|-  bgcolor="#CCFFCC"
| 2015-06-12 || Win ||align=left|Florian Breau  ||Final Legend || China  || Decision|| 3 || 
|-
|-  bgcolor="#CCFFCC"
| 2014-10-28 || Win ||align=left| Warren Starvuni  || Petyindee Promotions || Bangkok, Thailand || TKO || 1 || 
|-
|-  bgcolor="#FFBBBB"
| 2014-08-24 || Loss ||align=left| Vladimir Konsky || Kunlun Fight 8 || China || Decision || 3 || 3:00
|-
|-  bgcolor="#CCFFCC"
| 2014-06-06 || Win ||align=left| Singmanee Kaewsamrit || Muay Thai in Macau || Macau, China || TKO (cut) || 2 || 
|-
|-  bgcolor="#CCFFCC"
| 2014-05-17 || Win ||align=left| Gu Hui || Hero Legends || Shenzhen, China || Decision (unanimous) || 3 || 3:00
|-
|-  bgcolor="#FFBBBB"
| 2014-03-29 || Loss ||align=left| Victor Nagbe || Xtreme Muay Thai 2014, Semi Finals || Kowloon, Hong Kong || KO (left high kick) || 2 || 
|-
|-  bgcolor="#CCFFCC"
| 2014-02-16 || Win || align="left" | Toby Smith || MAX Muay Thai 6 || Zhengzhou, China || TKO (Elbow Cut) || 2 || 
|-
|-  bgcolor="#FFBBBB"
| 2014-01-25 || Loss ||align=left| Vitaly Gurkov || Ring Wars || Milan, Italy || Decision  || 5 || 3:00
|-
! style=background:white colspan=9 |
|-
|-  bgcolor="#CCFFCC"
| 2013-12-10 || Win || align="left" | Vahid Roshani || MAX Muay Thai 5: The Final Chapter || Khon Kaen, Thailand || Decision || 3 || 3:00
|-
|-  bgcolor="#CCFFCC"
| 2013-09-07 || Win ||align=left| Dylan Salvador || Millenium Team Fight || La Réunion || Decision  || 5 || 3:00
|-
|-  bgcolor="#CCFFCC"
| 2013-08-10 || Win || align="left" | Maiki Karathanasis || MAX Muay Thai 3 || Zhengzhou, China || KO (elbow) || 3 || 
|-
|-  bgcolor="#CCFFCC"
| 2013-05-06 || Win ||align=left|  Dylan Salvador || MAX Muay Thai 1 || Surin, Thailand || Decision (unanimous) || 3 || 3:00
|-
|-  bgcolor="#CCFFCC"
| 2013-02-14 || Win ||align=left| Mickael Piscitello || Best of Siam 3 || Paris, France || Decision (unanimous) || 5 || 3:00
|-
|-  bgcolor="#c5d2ea"
| 2013-01-26 || Draw ||align=left| Jordan Watson || Yokkao Extreme 2013 || Milan, Italy || Decision draw || 3 || 3:00
|-
|-  bgcolor="#FFBBBB"
| 2012-12-30 || Loss ||align=left| Yodsaenklai Fairtex || Muay Thai Combat Mania: Pattaya || Pattaya, Thailand || KO (elbow) || 3 || 
|-
|-  bgcolor="#FFBBBB"
| 2012-11-17 || Loss ||align=left| Andy Souwer || Shoot Boxing World Tournament 2012, Quarter Finals || Tokyo, Japan || Decision (majority) || 3 || 3:00
|-
|-  bgcolor="#CCFFCC"
| 2012-09-28 || Win ||align=left| Sirimongkol Sitanuparp || Toyota Vigo Marathon 2012, Final || Chiang Mai, Thailand || Decision || 3 || 3:00
|-
! style=background:white colspan=9 |
|-
|-  bgcolor="#CCFFCC"
| 2012-09-28 || Win ||align=left| Prakaysaeng Gaiyang 5 Daow || Toyota Vigo Marathon 2012, Semi Final || Chiang Mai, Thailand || Decision || 3 || 3:00
|-
|-  bgcolor="#CCFFCC"
| 2012-09-28 || Win ||align=left| Thepsuthin Pumpanmuang || Toyota Vigo Marathon 2012, Quarter Final || Chiang Mai, Thailand || Decision || 3 || 3:00
|-
|-  bgcolor="#CCFFCC"
| 2012-06-09 || Win ||align=left| Alejandro Asumu Osa || WBC Battle of the belts || Bangkok, Thailand || KO (Right Elbow) || 2 || 
|-
! style=background:white colspan=9 |
|-
|-  bgcolor="#FFBBBB"
| 2012-05-26 || Loss ||align=left| David Kyria || Glory 1: Stockholm - 70 kg Slam Tournament, First Round || Stockholm, Sweden || Decision (Unanimous) || 3 || 3:00
|-
|-  bgcolor="#CCFFCC"
| 2012-04-17 || Win ||align=left| Mickael Cornubet || Thai Fight 2012 || Pattaya, Thailand || TKO (Doctor Stoppage) || 1 || 2:04
|-
|-  bgcolor="#CCFFCC"
| 2011-12-18 || Win ||align=left| Fabio Pinca || Thai Fight 2011 67 kg Tournament, Final || Bangkok, Thailand || Decision || 3 || 3:00
|-
! style=background:white colspan=9 |
|-
|-  bgcolor="#CCFFCC"
| 2011-11-27 || Win ||align=left| Dongsu Kim || Thai Fight 2011 67 kg Tournament, Semi Final || Bangkok, Thailand || Decision || 5 || 3:00
|-
|-  bgcolor="#CCFFCC"
| 2011-09-25 || Win ||align=left| Alessio Angelo || Thai Fight 2011 67 kg Tournament, Quarter Final || Bangkok, Thailand || TKO (Elbow/Cut) || 1 ||
|-
|-  bgcolor="#CCFFCC"
| 2011-06-11 || Win ||align=left| Nopparat Keatkhamtorn || Isuzu Tournament Final, Omnoi Stadium || Bangkok, Thailand || KO (Elbow/Cut) || 3 ||
|-
! style=background:white colspan=9 |
|-
|-  bgcolor="#CCFFCC"
| 2011-04-16 || Win ||align=left| Prakaisaeng Sit O || Isuzu Tournament Semi Final, Omnoi Stadium || Bangkok, Thailand || DQ (Referee stop) || 4 || 1:30
|-
|-  bgcolor="#CCFFCC"
| 2011-02-12 || Win ||align=left| Kongjak Sor Tuantong || Isuzu Tournament 3rd Round, Omnoi Stadium || Bangkok, Thailand || KO (Right elbow) || 2 ||
|-
|-  bgcolor="#FFBBBB"
| 2011-01-15 || Loss ||align=left| Sudsakorn Sor Klinmee || Isuzu Tournament 2nd Round, Omnoi Stadium || Bangkok, Thailand || Decision || 5 || 3:00
|-
|-  bgcolor="#CCFFCC"
| 2010-12-25 || Win ||align=left| Nopparat Keatkhamtorn || Isuzu Tournament 1st Round, Omnoi Stadium || Bangkok, Thailand || TKO (Ref. stop/right cross) || 3 || 0:39
|-
|-  bgcolor="#CCFFCC"
| 2010-11-26 || Win ||align=left| Abdallah Mabel || La Nuit des Champions 2010 || Marseilles, France || Decision || 5 || 3:00
|-
! style=background:white colspan=9 |
|-
|-  bgcolor="#CCFFCC"
| 2010-11-02 || Win ||align=left| Prakaisaeng Sit O || Lumpini & Ratchadamnern Charity Event || Bangkok, Thailand || Decision || 5 || 3:00
|-
|-  bgcolor="#FFBBBB"
| 2010-09-12 || Loss ||align=left| Rachid Belaini || Fightingstars presents: It's Showtime 2010 || Amsterdam, Netherlands || KO || 2 ||
|-  bgcolor="#FFBBBB"
| 2010-08-10 || Loss ||align=left| Prakaisaeng Sit O || Petchpiya, Lumpinee Stadium || Bangkok, Thailand || Decision || 5 || 3:00
|-
! style=background:white colspan=9 |
|-
|-  bgcolor="#CCFFCC"
| 2010-06-19 || Win ||align=left| Abdallah Mabel || Explosion Fight Night Volume 01, Final|| Brest, France || Ext.R Decision (Unanimous) || 4 || 3:00
|-
! style=background:white colspan=9 |
|-
|-  bgcolor="#CCFFCC"
| 2010-06-19 || Win ||align=left| Ludovic Millet || Explosion Fight Night Volume 01, Semi Final|| Brest, France || Decision (Unanimous) || 3 || 3:00
|-  bgcolor="#FFBBBB"
| 2010-03-13 || Loss ||align=left| Giorgio Petrosyan || Oktagon presents: It's Showtime 2010 || Milan, Italy || Decision (Unanimous) || 3 || 3:00
|-  bgcolor="#CCFFCC"
| 2010-01-30 || Win ||align=left| Ali Abrayem || La Nuit des Titans|| Tours, France || TKO (Corner stoppage/low kicks) || 3 ||
|-  bgcolor="#CCFFCC"
| 2009-11-28 || Win ||align=left| Diego Calzolari || Gotti Promotion presents: Muay Thai || Trieste, Italy || TKO (Corner stop/elbows) ||3 ||
|-
! style=background:white colspan=9 |
|-
|-  bgcolor="#CCFFCC"
| 2009-11-14 || Win ||align=left| Fabio Pinca || La Nuit des Champions 2009 || Marseilles, France || Decision (Unanimous) || 5 || 3:00
|-
! style=background:white colspan=9 |
|-
|-  bgcolor="#CCFFCC"
| 2009-09-18 || Win ||align=left| Sudsakorn Sor Klinmee || Kiatpet Fights, Lumpinee Stadium || Bangkok, Thailand || TKO (Referee stoppage) || 3 ||
|-  bgcolor="#CCFFCC"
| 2009-08-27 || Win ||align=left| Egon Racz || Thepprasit Fairtex Stadium || Pattaya, Thailand || TKO (Ref stop/knockdowns) || 4 ||
|-  bgcolor="#CCFFCC"
| 2009-05-16 || Win ||align=left| Alex Baena || Légendes et Guerriers || Toulouse, France || Decision (Unanimous) || 5 || 3:00
|-  bgcolor="#CCFFCC"
| 2009-04-10 || Win ||align=left| Chai Pomee SPR Krungthep || || Chon Buri, Thailand || TKO || 1 ||
|-  bgcolor="#CCFFCC"
| 2009-04-09 || Win ||align=left| Parinya Jockey Gym || || Chon Buri, Thailand || Decision (Unanimous) || 3 || 3:00
|-  bgcolor="#CCFFCC"
| 2009-04-08 || Win ||align=left| Rambo Panyathip || || Chon Buri, Thailand || Decision (Unanimous) || 3 || 3:00
|-  bgcolor="#CCFFCC"
| 2009-03-02 || Win ||align=left| Diesellek TopkingBoxing || Paorungchujaroen, Rajadamnern Stadium || Bangkok, Thailand || Decision (Unanimous) || 5 || 3:00
|-
! style=background:white colspan=9 |
|-
|-  bgcolor="#CCFFCC"
| 2009-01-03 || Win ||align=left| Shiriya Ishige || M.I.D. Japan presents "Thailand Japan" 2009 || Japan || TKO || 3 ||
|-  bgcolor="#CCFFCC"
| 2008-12-21 || Win ||align=left| Rudolf Durica || Return of the King II || Paramaribo, Suriname || Decision (Unanimous) || 3 || 3:00
|-  bgcolor="#CCFFCC"
| 2008-12-05 || Win ||align=left| Egon Racz || King's Cup WMC/S-1 tournament || Bangkok, Thailand || Decision (Unanimous) || 3 || 3:00
|-
! style=background:white colspan=9 |
|-
|-  bgcolor="#CCFFCC"
| 2008-12-05 || Win ||align=left| Vladimir Konsky || King's Cup WMC/S-1 tournament || Bangkok, Thailand || Decision (Unanimous) || 3 || 3:00
|-  bgcolor="#CCFFCC"
| 2008-12-05 || Win ||align=left| Aliu Berat || King's Cup WMC/S-1 tournament || Bangkok, Thailand || Decision (Unanimous) || 3 || 3:00
|-  bgcolor="#CCFFCC"
| 2008-09-22 || Win ||align=left| Big Ben Chor Praram 6 || Daorungchujarern, Rajadamnern Stadium || Bangkok, Thailand || Decision (Unanimous) || 5 || 3:00
|-  bgcolor="#CCFFCC"
| 2008-08-14 || Win ||align=left| Singmanee Sor Srisompong || Jarumueang , Rajadamnern Stadium || Bangkok, Thailand || KO (Right overhand)|| 5 || 0:59
|-  bgcolor="#CCFFCC"
| 2008-06-12 || Win ||align=left| Nopparat Keatkhamtorn || Onesongchai , Rajaphat Institute || Nakhon Pathom, Thailand || Decision (Unanimous) || 5 || 3:00
|-  bgcolor="#CCFFCC"
| 2008-05-05 || Win ||align=left| Nopparat Keatkhamtorn ||  || Bangkok, Thailand || KO || 2 ||
|-  bgcolor="#FFBBBB"
| 2008-02-07 || Loss ||align=left| Nopparat Keatkhamtorn || Wanthongchai, Rajadamnern Stadium || Bangkok, Thailand || Decision (Unanimous) || 5 || 3:00
|-  bgcolor="#CCFFCC"
| 2007-07-20 || Win ||align=left| Kongpipop Petchyindee || Sor.Pumpanmuang, Lumpinee Stadium || Bangkok, Thailand || TKO || 5 ||
|-  bgcolor="#FFBBBB"
| 2007-05-23 || Loss ||align=left| Nopparat Keatkhamtorn || Sor.Sommai, Rajadamnern Stadium || Bangkok, Thailand || Decision || 5 || 3:00
|-  bgcolor="#FFBBBB"
| 2007-02-05 || Loss ||align=left| Sanchainoi W.Phetpoon || Onesongchai, Rajadamnern Stadium || Bangkok, Thailand || Decision || 5 || 3:00
|-  bgcolor="#CCFFCC"
| 2006-12-28 || Win ||align=left| Sanchainoi W.Phetpoon || Phetthongkam, Rajadamnern Stadium || Bangkok, Thailand || Decision || 5 || 3:00
|-
|-  bgcolor="#CCFFCC"
| 2006-11-30 || Win ||align=left| Puja Sor.Suwannee || Onesongchai, Rajadamnern Stadium || Bangkok, Thailand || Decision || 5 || 3:00
|-
! style=background:white colspan=9 |
|-
|-  bgcolor="#CCFFCC"
| 2006-10-19 || Win ||align=left| Saenchainoi Saendetgym || Onesongchai, Rajadamnern Stadium || Bangkok, Thailand || Decision (Unanimous) || 5 || 3:00
|-  bgcolor="#c5d2ea"
| 2006-08-31 || Draw ||align=left| Puja Sor.Suwanee || Onesongchai, Rajadamnern Stadium || Bangkok, Thailand || Decision draw || 5 || 3:00
|-  bgcolor="#CCFFCC"
| 2006-05-04 || Win ||align=left| Nongbee Kiatyongyut || Kiatyongyuth, Rajadamnern Stadium || Bangkok, Thailand || Decision || 5 || 3:00
|-
|-  bgcolor="#CCFFCC"
| 2006-03-06 || Win ||align=left| Yodbuangarm Lukbanyai ||Onesongchai, Rajadamnern Stadium || Bangkok, Thailand || Decision || 5 || 3:00
|-
|-  bgcolor="#FFBBBB"
| 2005-12-22 || Loss ||align=left| Yodbuangarm Lukbanyai || Rajadamnern Celebration Fights || Bangkok, Thailand || TKO || 2 ||
|-
|-  bgcolor="#CCFFCC"
| 2005-08-05 || Win ||align=left| Sibmean Lamtongkarnpat || Paianun, Rajadamnern Stadium || Bangkok, Thailand || TKO || 5 ||
|-  bgcolor="#FFBBBB"
| 2005-04-21 || Loss ||align=left| Puja Sor.Suwanee || Onesongchai, Rajadamnern Stadium || Bangkok, Thailand || Decision  || 5 || 3:00
|-  bgcolor="#FFBBBB"
| 2005-02-12 || Loss ||align=left| Saenchai Sor Kingstar || OneSongchai Tsunami Show, Rajamangala Stadium || Bangkok, Thailand || KO (Throw) || 4 ||
|-  bgcolor="#FFBBBB"
| 2004-12-29 || Loss ||align=left| Nongbee Kiatyongyut || Onesongchai, Rajadamnern Stadium || Bangkok, Thailand || Decision (Unanimous) || 5 || 3:00
|-  bgcolor="#CCFFCC"
| 2004-10-25 || Win ||align=left| Saenchai Sor Kingstar || Palokmuaythai ITV, Siam Omnoi Stadium || Bangkok, Thailand || Decision (Unanimous) || 5 || 3:00
|-  bgcolor="#FFBBBB"
| 2004-06-07 || Loss ||align=left| Saenchai Sor Kingstar || Onesongchai, Rajadamnern Stadium || Bangkok, Thailand || Decision (Unanimous) || 5 || 3:00
|-  bgcolor="#CCFFCC"
| 2004-05-05 || Win ||align=left| Esorasak J.Ratchadakkhon || Jaobunlunglok, Rajadamnern Stadium || Bangkok, Thailand || Decision (Unanimous) || 5 || 3:00
|-  bgcolor="#CCFFCC"
| 2004-03-04 || Win ||align=left| Phet-Ek Sitjaopho || Onesongchai, Rajadamnern Stadium || Bangkok, Thailand || Decision (Unanimous) || 5 || 3:00
|-  bgcolor="#FFBBBB"
| 2003-11-26 || Loss ||align=left| Puja Sor.Suwanee || Petchtongkam, Rajadamnern Stadium || Bangkok, Thailand || Decision (Unanimous) || 5 || 3:00
|-  bgcolor="#CCFFCC"
| 2003-10-16 || Win ||align=left| Pornpitak Petchaudomchai || Onesongchai, Rajadamnern Stadium || Bangkok, Thailand || Decision (Unanimous) || 5 || 3:00

|-  bgcolor="#CCFFCC"
| 2002- || Win ||align=left| Phetto Sitjaopho||  Rajadamnern Stadium || Bangkok, Thailand || Decision  || 5 || 3:00 
|-  bgcolor="#CCFFCC"
| 2002- || Win ||align=left| Phetek Sitjaopho||  Rajadamnern Stadium || Bangkok, Thailand || Decision  || 5 || 3:00 
|-  bgcolor="#CCFFCC"
| 2002- || Win ||align=left| Sangnoi Kiatpraphat||  Rajadamnern Stadium || Bangkok, Thailand || Decision  || 5 || 3:00 
|-  bgcolor="#CCFFCC"
| 2002- || Win ||align=left| Puja Sor.Suwanee||  Rajadamnern Stadium || Bangkok, Thailand || Decision  || 5 || 3:00 
|-  bgcolor="#CCFFCC"
| 2002-07-04 || Win ||align=left| Ngatao Atrungrott||  Rajadamnern Stadium || Bangkok, Thailand || Decision  || 5 || 3:00 
|-  bgcolor="#CCFFCC"
| 2002- || Win ||align=left| Dendanai Kiatsakkongka||  Rajadamnern Stadium || Bangkok, Thailand || Decision  || 5 || 3:00 
|-  bgcolor="#CCFFCC"
| 2002- || Win ||align=left| Thepbancha Sitmonchai|| Rajadamnern Stadium || Bangkok, Thailand || KO  || 1 || 
|-  bgcolor="#CCFFCC"
| 2002- || Win ||align=left| Sornnoi Pornsawan Minimart|| Rajadamnern Stadium || Bangkok, Thailand || TKO  || 4 || 
|-
| colspan=9 | Legend:    

|-  bgcolor="#FFBBBB"
| 2012-09-11 || Loss ||align=left| Vitaly Gurkov || IFMA 2012 World Muaythai Championships, 1/2 final (71 kg) || Saint Petersburg, Russia || Decision (Majority) || 4 || 2:00
|-
! style=background:white colspan=9 |
|-
|-  bgcolor="#CCFFCC"
| 2012-09-10 || Win ||align=left| Smagulov Almas || IFMA 2012 World Muaythai Championships, 1/4 final (71 kg) || Saint Petersburg, Russia || Decision || 4 || 2:00
|-
|-  bgcolor="#CCFFCC"
| 2012-09-08 || Win ||align=left| Azizbek Nazarov || IFMA 2012 World Muaythai Championships, 2nd Round (71 kg) || Saint Petersburg, Russia || KO || 1 || 
|-
|-  bgcolor="#CCFFCC"
| 2012-09-07 || Win ||align=left| Jarkko Kekaraien || IFMA 2012 World Muaythai Championships, 1st Round (71 kg) || Saint Petersburg, Russia || Decision || 4 || 2:00
|-
| colspan=9 | Legend:

See also
List of male kickboxers

External links
Kem Muaythai Gym 
Sitsongpeenong Muaythai Camp

References

1984 births
Living people
Bantamweight kickboxers
Featherweight kickboxers
Lightweight kickboxers
Welterweight kickboxers
Kem Sitsongpeenong
Kem Sitsongpeenong
Kunlun Fight kickboxers